Mick De Giulio (born 1953) is an American designer, author and product designer widely recognized for growing the discipline of kitchen design.  
His highly customized rooms and furnishings met the rising importance of the kitchen in late 20th Century interior design with a dual focus on elevating its craft and functionality.  Experimenting with open plans that allow for multiple family cooks to share work within a widening range of opportunities for gathering, he promoted the kitchen as the home's versatile new locus for entertaining.  His designs often reveal their full art and flexibility in use, employing movable surfaces and fine architectural detail to alternately hide or draw eyes to kitchen activities. 
De Giulio's legacy to industry practices includes his innovations to the kitchen's range of products and furnishings (adding new levels of customization and versatility to kitchen cabinetry, the sink, kitchen appliances, and light fixtures) for instance,  and his avid promotion of the kitchen designer as a profession beyond that of the cabinet seller.  He is the author of two books on kitchen design, KitchenCentric (co-author Karen Klages Grace, Balcony Press, 2010) and KITCHEN (with Candace Ord Manroe, Pointed Leaf Press, 2015).

Interiors
De Giulio founded his company, de Giulio Kitchen Design, in 1984, now headquartered in Wilmette, Illinois with commissions spanning the United States and abroad. His work has been extensively profiled in leading design publications including Architectural Digest, House Beautiful, Interior Design, Forbes,  Robb Report,  Traditional Home, Germany's Architektur & Wohnen, France's Maison Francaise,  and Italy's Ottagano as well as in books, newspapers, and on television (HGTV). Notable projects include residential kitchens for the Ritz-Carlton Residences, Chicago (2012),  as well as widely published industry commissions including training and demonstration kitchens for Sub-Zero/Wolf/Cove corporate headquarters and regional showrooms,  concept spaces for Kohler Co. headquarters, and an 11,000 square foot retail showroom for Abt Electronics.  Prominent media commissions include research and demonstration kitchens for the Chicago Tribune (1995), Better Homes and Gardens/Meredith Corporation (2005) and the House Beautiful Kitchen of the Year (2012) installed for public viewing at Rockefeller Center in New York.

Product Design
De Giulio is the designer of several internationally distributed kitchen product lines. His cabinetry for SieMatic Corporation based in Löhne, Germany. was selected for the kitchen at Washington D.C.'s historic presidential guest home, Blair House in 2002,  while his BeauxArts cabinetry (introduced by SieMatic in 2004 and updated in 2011) is hailed as a design milestone for the industry. Unique for its mix of surface options and frame styles, BeauxArts grew a demand for customization and remains a bestseller for SieMatic worldwide. Kallista, a Kohler Company, introduced the Mick De Giulio Kitchen Sink Collection in 2011  pioneering corner drains to maximize basin space and multi-tiered task-oriented accessories to transform the sink into a more versatile workspace. (His Multiere sink was voted Best of Year by Interior Design magazine).  A mixed-metals faucet with new water spray technology for Kallista followed in 2020 and was also voted Best of Year by Interior Design magazine. Under the de Giulio Collection brand, his contributions extend from specialty sinks and sliding backsplashes to ventilation hoods, hardware, metalwork, and unique kitchen case pieces. Custom metalwork also inspires De Giulio's lighting designs, several now licensed by Tech Lighting (a Visual Comfort & Co. brand).

Notes

External links
 SieMatic BeauxArts.02
 Kallista
 House Beautiful Kitchen of the Year
 Style Park
 Tech Lighting

American interior designers
1953 births
Living people